Kopstein's emo skink (Emoia jakati) is a species of lizard in the family Scincidae. It is widespread in Oceania.

References

Emoia
Reptiles described in 1926
Taxa named by Felix Kopstein